Salvador Namburete was Minister of Energy of Mozambique.

References

External links
 Biography on the World Bank site

Living people
Energy in Mozambique
Government ministers of Mozambique
Year of birth missing (living people)
Place of birth missing (living people)